Darren Bewick (born 21 August 1967) is a former Australian rules footballer who won two premierships with the Essendon Football Club in the Australian Football League (AFL). Bewick's game breaking pace & goal sense inside the attacking 50 was legendary amongst Bomber fans.

After debuting in 1988, Bewick played in all three of Essendon's finals in 1989. In 1990, Bewick played in Essendon's losing Grand Final team against Collingwood.

In the Preliminary Final of 1993, Bewick was instrumental in Essendon's comeback victory (trailing the Adelaide Crows by 42 points at half-time) to earn a place in the 1993 AFL Grand Final. Bewick kicked a game high 6 goals (equal with that of Adelaide full forward Tony Modra), kicking his 5th & 6th goals in the final term to level the scores, with Gary O'Donnell kicking truly to put Essendon in front. Essendon went on to defeat Adelaide by 11 points, with the sealer kicked by returning Essendon great, Tim Watson. The win secured Essendon a place in the 1993 AFL Grand Final against Carlton. Essendon dominated the premiership decider, winning by 44 points.

In the round 11 match against Geelong in 1995, Bewick ruptured his anterior cruciate ligament in an incident during the second quarter, ending his season. He played his comeback match (and 150th AFL game) against Geelong in the centenary re-enactment match at the MCG in round 7, 1996. In a best-on-ground display, Bewick kicked nine goals from 11 kicks - including a spectacular finish from the boundary for his eighth goal.

Bewick retired after the 2000 AFL Grand Final, in which Essendon defeated Melbourne by 60 points, claiming the club's record 16th AFL premiership.

Since retiring from playing Bewick has worked in junior coaching and development.  He is the long-standing coach of Eastern Ranges in the NAB League, the premier underage competition in Victoria. He first gained the position in 2010 and coached them to a premiership in 2013.

Playing statistics

|- style="background-color: #EAEAEA"
! scope="row" style="text-align:center" | 1988
|style="text-align:center;"|
| 8 || 18 || 19 || 19 || 253 || 74 || 327 || 58 || 25 || 1.1 || 1.1 || 14.1 || 4.1 || 18.2 || 3.2 || 1.4
|-
! scope="row" style="text-align:center" | 1989
|style="text-align:center;"|
| 8 || 13 || 30 || 14 || 163 || 60 || 223 || 43 || 26 || 2.3 || 1.1 || 12.5 || 4.6 || 17.2 || 3.3 || 2.0
|- style="background:#eaeaea;"
! scope="row" style="text-align:center" | 1990
|style="text-align:center;"|
| 8 || 25 || 37 || 33 || 338 || 112 || 450 || 68 || 30 || 1.5 || 1.3 || 13.5 || 4.5 || 18.0 || 2.7 || 1.2
|-
! scope="row" style="text-align:center" | 1991
|style="text-align:center;"|
| 8 || 18 || 25 || 19 || 279 || 113 || 392 || 59 || 7 || 1.4 || 1.1 || 15.5 || 6.3 || 21.8 || 3.3 || 0.4
|- style="background:#eaeaea;"
! scope="row" style="text-align:center" | 1992
|style="text-align:center;"|
| 8 || 20 || 32 || 28 || 271 || 94 || 365 || 66 || 21 || 1.6 || 1.4 || 13.6 || 4.7 || 18.3 || 3.3 || 1.1
|-
|style="text-align:center;background:#afe6ba;"|1993†
|style="text-align:center;"|
| 8 || 24 || 52 || 30 || 315 || 119 || 434 || 61 || 38 || 2.2 || 1.3 || 13.1 || 5.0 || 18.1 || 2.5 || 1.6
|- style="background:#eaeaea;"
! scope="row" style="text-align:center" | 1994
|style="text-align:center;"|
| 8 || 21 || 20 || 34 || 302 || 110 || 412 || 79 || 24 || 1.0 || 1.6 || 14.4 || 5.2 || 19.6 || 3.8 || 1.1
|-
! scope="row" style="text-align:center" | 1995
|style="text-align:center;"|
| 8 || 10 || 21 || 13 || 138 || 53 || 191 || 22 || 13 || 2.1 || 1.3 || 13.8 || 5.3 || 19.1 || 2.2 || 1.3
|- style="background:#eaeaea;"
! scope="row" style="text-align:center" | 1996
|style="text-align:center;"|
| 8 || 18 || 28 || 21 || 226 || 89 || 315 || 61 || 15 || 1.6 || 1.2 || 12.6 || 4.9 || 17.5 || 3.4 || 0.8
|-
! scope="row" style="text-align:center" | 1997
|style="text-align:center;"|
| 8 || 5 || 2 || 4 || 48 || 22 || 70 || 13 || 3 || 0.4 || 0.8 || 9.6 || 4.4 || 14.0 || 2.6 || 0.6
|- style="background:#eaeaea;"
! scope="row" style="text-align:center" | 1998
|style="text-align:center;"|
| 8 || 23 || 32 || 16 || 256 || 87 || 343 || 64 || 17 || 1.4 || 0.7 || 11.1 || 3.8 || 14.9 || 2.8 || 0.7
|-
! scope="row" style="text-align:center" | 1999
|style="text-align:center;"|
| 8 || 24 || 20 || 17 || 301 || 73 || 374 || 54 || 27 || 0.8 || 0.7 || 12.5 || 3.0 || 15.6 || 2.3 || 1.1
|- style="background:#eaeaea;"
|style="text-align:center;background:#afe6ba;"|2000†
|style="text-align:center;"|
| 8 || 19 || 14 || 12 || 195 || 64 || 259 || 48 || 26 || 0.7 || 0.6 || 10.3 || 3.4 || 13.6 || 2.5 || 1.4
|- class="sortbottom"
! colspan=3| Career
! 238
! 332
! 260
! 3085
! 1070
! 4155
! 696
! 272
! 1.4
! 1.1
! 13.0
! 4.5
! 17.5
! 2.9
! 1.1
|}

References

External links

1967 births
Living people
Essendon Football Club players
Essendon Football Club Premiership players
West Perth Football Club players
Western Australian State of Origin players
Australian rules footballers from Perth, Western Australia
Two-time VFL/AFL Premiership players